The Riga–Daugavpils railway line is a  long railway line in Latvia which connects the cities of Riga in central Latvia and Daugavpils in south-eastern Latvia.

The railway line is double track between Riga and Krustpils and single track between Krustpils and Daugavpils. It was built in 1861, and is one the oldest railway lines in Latvia.

History 

The railway line was opened on 21 September 1861 as one of the first railway lines in the present territory of Latvia. At Daugavpils the line connected with the Saint Petersburg–Warsaw Railway, and thus joined the city of Riga with the Russian rail network. In 1894, the line became the property of the state.

See also 
 Rail transport in Latvia
 History of rail transport in Latvia

References

External links
 Latvijas dzelzceļš (LDz) – manager of the public railway infrastructure in Latvia

1861 establishments in the Russian Empire
19th-century establishments in Latvia
5 ft gauge railways in Latvia
Railway lines in Latvia
Railway lines opened in 1861
Transport in Daugavpils
Transport in Riga